Dragomabin is a bio-active isolate of marine cyanobacteria, Lyngbya majuscula, which has been shown to have good antimalarial activity.

References

Lipopeptides